Harbanspura is a town of Lahore in Punjab. It is located on the bank of a canal and near to the Indian border. It was a jaagir of Raja Harbans Singh. After his death, his widow, Rani Chawnia became the owner of the estate. At the time of independence, the estate was declared state land as evacuee property and its tenants got control of it.

See also 
 Lahore
 Harbanspura Interchange

References 

Aziz Bhatti Zone